David Endicott Putnam (1898–1918) was an American fighter ace during World War I. Although he lodged combat claims for at least 34 victories, he was credited with only 13 confirmed aerial victories while flying combat for both French and American units. While 16 unconfirmed victories are listed, data on the remainder of the unconfirmed combat claims are unavailable.

The victory list

Confirmed victories in this list are numbered and listed chronologically, rather than in order of confirmation.
Abbreviations from sources utilized were expanded by editor creating this list.

Footnotes

Citations

Bibliography

 Jon Guttman. Balloon-Busting Aces of World War 1 . Osprey Publishing, 2005. , 

Aerial victories of Putnam, David Endicott
Putnam, David Endicott